Maksym Aleksandrovich Vasilyev (born 14 April 1990) is a Ukrainian cyclist, who currently rides for UCI Continental team . He competed in the team pursuit at the 2014 UCI Track Cycling World Championships.

Major results

2010
 8th Mayor Cup
 10th Overall Tour of Szeklerland
2011
 1st Stage 2 Sibiu Cycling Tour
 4th Overall Grand Prix of Sochi
2012
 2nd Road race, National Road Championships
 7th Jurmala Grand Prix
 8th Overall Tour of Romania
1st Stage 3
 10th Overall Tour d'Azerbaïdjan
1st Points classification
2013
 6th Central European Tour Budapest GP
 10th Central European Tour Košice–Miskolc
2014
 1st Stage 6 Grand Prix of Sochi
 7th Grand Prix of Moscow
 8th Central European Tour Szerencs–Ibrány
 10th Central European Tour Budapest GP
2015
 3rd Grand Prix of ISD
 4th Memorial Grundmanna I Wizowskiego
 5th Race Horizon Park Classic
 6th Korona Kocich Gór
2016
 6th Overall Baltic Chain Tour
 6th Belgrade–Banja Luka II
 6th Grand Prix Minsk
 8th Overall Tour of China I
 9th Memoriał Romana Siemińskiego
 9th Minsk Cup
2018
 3rd Road race, National Road Championships
 5th Race Horizon Park Classic
 6th Race Horizon Park Maidan
 9th Overall Tour of Cartier
 9th Visegrad 4 Bicycle Race – GP Poland

References

External links

1990 births
Living people
People from Kyiv Oblast
Ukrainian track cyclists
Ukrainian male cyclists
Place of birth missing (living people)